Irti (Finnish for "Off" or "Loose") is the fourth solo album of Ismo Alanko, released in 1996. According to Alanko, he and his band gave themselves two weeks time to compose and record the album from scratch. The result is an improvisation-based, more freely-played album than the preceding Taiteilijaelämää.

Track listing 
Music and lyrics by Ismo Alanko.
 "Piste"—5:04
 "Kriisistä kriisiin"—5:28
 "Elämä on hauras"—5:18
 "Häpeä ja kateus"—2:57
 "Aika kuolla"—6:33
 "Mitä se mulle kuuluu mitä mä teen"—5:12
 "Rakkauden tila"—3:47
 "Rokin kreivi"—3:19
 "Miespaholainen"—3:50
 "Lokki"—3:57
 "Lasten laulu"—3:50

Personnel 
 Ismo Alanko -- vocals, guitar, cello
 Jouko Hohko -- bass, vocals
 Ismo "Ippe" Kätkä -- drums, percussion
 Riku Mattila—guitar
 Teho Majamäki -- marimba, vibraphone, keyboards, percussion
 Ismo "Izmo" Heikkilä -- synthesizer

References 

1996 albums
Ismo Alanko albums